Ashley Elizabeth Cain (born July 22, 1995) is a retired American pair skater. With her skating partner, Timothy LeDuc, she is a two-time U.S. national champion (2019, 2022), the 2018 Four Continents silver medalist, and a two-time Grand Prix medalist. Earlier in her career, she also competed in single skating, becoming the 2013 Nebelhorn Trophy bronze medalist and the 2012 U.S. Junior silver medalist.

Personal life 
Ashley Cain was born July 22, 1995, in Carrollton, Texas. She is the daughter of Peter Cain, an Australian former pair skater who competed at the 1980 Olympics, and Darlene Wendt, a Canadian former ice dancer. She is also the niece of Elizabeth Cain and the cousin of Sean Carlow, who competed for Australia in pair skating and men's singles, respectively. She became engaged to Dalton Gribble in March 2018, and they married on June 1, 2019. Cain and Gribble divorced in 2022.

Cain studied online at Texas Tech University Independent School.

Career 
Cain began learning to skate in 1999. Her father introduced her to pairs when she was seven or eight years old. She is a member of U.S. Figure Skating's DREAM (Determination, Responsibility, Education, Achievement, Motivation) Team, which is involved in mentoring developing skaters.

Early partnerships 
Competing in novice pairs, Cain finished 8th with Sergei Sidorov at the 2008 U.S. Championships. She teamed up with Joshua Reagan in April 2009. The pair was coached by David Kirby and Peter Cain at the Dr. Pepper Star Center in Euless, Texas.

In the 2010–11 season, Cain/Reagan received two Junior Grand Prix assignments, placing sixth in England and taking silver in the Czech Republic. In January 2011, they won the U.S. national junior title, becoming the only pair ever to win U.S. novice and junior titles in consecutive years. They ranked eighth in the short program, fourth in the free skate, and fourth overall at the 2011 World Junior Championships in Gangneung, South Korea.

The following season, Cain/Reagan moved up to the senior level. They ranked fourth at the 2011 International Cup of Nice and sixth at their sole Grand Prix assignment, the 2011 Cup of Russia, before placing sixth at the 2012 U.S. Championships. On February 24, 2012, they announced the end of their partnership.

Single skating 
As a single skater, Cain began competing on the ISU Junior Grand Prix series in 2011 and won silver on the junior level at the 2012 U.S. Championships. She won the bronze medal at the 2013 Nebelhorn Trophy, her first senior international. The following season, she took bronze at the 2014 Ondrej Nepela Trophy and was invited to two Grand Prix events, the 2014 Cup of China and 2014 Rostelecom Cup.

Due to fatigue, Cain decided to retire from singles skating in September 2016.

Partnership with LeDuc 
Following a suggestion from U.S. Figure Skating's Mitch Moyer, Cain tried out with Timothy LeDuc in May 2016. On May 23, 2016, they confirmed their intention to compete together. Peter Cain coaches the pair in Euless, Texas.

2016–17 season 
Cain/LeDuc received three Challenger Series assignments. After placing fourth at the 2016 Nebelhorn Trophy and 2016 Finlandia Trophy, they were awarded the bronze medal at the 2016 Golden Spin of Zagreb, where they upgraded their twist from a double to a triple. Cain stated, "We just started rotating it days before we left for that competition." She had never performed it in competition during her earlier partnerships. They placed third at the 2017 US Figure Skating Championships. They placed ninth at the 2017 Four Continents Championships.

2017–18 season 
Cain/LeDuc started the season at the 2017 CS Lombardia Trophy, where they placed fourth. Cain/LeDuc placed seventh at the 2017 CS Nebelhorn Trophy. They placed sixth at the 2017 Cup of China. Cain and LeDuc placed fourth overall at the 2018 US Figure Skating Championships. They placed second at the 2018 Four Continents Championships, winning their first medal at an ISU championship event.

2018–19 season 
At the 2018 US International Figure Skating Classic, Cain/LeDuc placed first overall with a score of 173.05. They placed first overall at the 2018 Ondrej Nepela Trophy], with a score of 181.56.  At their first Grand Prix event of the season, 2018 Skate America, they placed 4th in the short program and 3rd overall with a score of 175.05. At the 2018 Rostelecom Cup, they placed 7th in the short program and 6th overall, scoring 170.29.

Cain/LeDuc competed in a third Challenger event, the 2018 Golden Spin of Zagreb. Second after the short program, they placed fifth overall, following two falls in the free skate. The second fall involved Cain being dropped on her head while exiting a lift, seemingly being knocked unconscious briefly, before getting up and completing the program. She was subsequently taken to the hospital. There was considerable controversy amongst commentators that the referee had not halted the performance.  She was subsequently diagnosed with a concussion.

At the 2019 U.S. Championships, she and LeDuc won their first US pairs title after placing second in the short program and first in the free skate.  Speaking afterward, Cain said, "I was in the hospital in Croatia staring at the ceiling, thinking I need to remember this moment because a month from now, I want to be on top of the podium. It shows that with hard work, you can get to this moment. My team never gave up on me, even when I was at my lowest of lows. I have been lucky, even with the concussion." As national champions, Cain/LeDuc were assigned to compete at the 2019 Four Continents Championships in early February and as America's sole pairs team at the 2019 World Championships in Saitama, Japan.

Cain/LeDuc finished fourth at the Four Continents Championships, the highest placement for an American team, after finishing fourth in both segments.  Cain had struggled in the practice sessions beforehand and felt dehydrated, but recovered and said she was satisfied with how they had performed.

At the World Championships, their first, Cain/LeDuc, placed ninth.  LeDuc described the season as a "rollercoaster", given the issues with injuries, while Cain expressed pleasure at having earned a second pairs spot for the United States at the following year's World Championships.  Cain/LeDuc concluded their season as part of the gold medal-winning Team USA at the 2019 World Team Trophy.

2019–20 season 
Cain/LeDuc began the season at the 2019 CS U.S. Classic, where they won gold, defeating reigning World silver medalists Evgenia Tarasova / Vladimir Morozov.  They were considered one of the favorites for the gold medal at their first Grand Prix assignment of the year, the 2019 Skate America.  They placed third in the short program after Cain fell on their throw triple Lutz.  In the free skate, they had a second throw Lutz fall, as well as a popped side-by-side jump attempt and an aborted lift, which dropped them to fifth place overall.  At their second Grand Prix, the 2019 Internationaux de France, Cain again fell on their throw Lutz in the short program, putting them fourth after that segment.  They finally landed the throw Lutz in the free skate but remained in fourth place overall after Cain fell on their side-by-side triple Salchow attempt.

Competing at the 2020 U.S. Championships, Cain/LeDuc were fourth in the short program after she two-footed the landing of their throw Lutz and an error resulted in their death spiral element being completely invalidated.  Struggling with the quality of elements in the free skate, they remained in fourth place overall, winning the pewter medal.  LeDuc remarked, "it just wasn't in the cards for us today.

Despite their fourth place at the national championships, Cain/LeDuc were assigned to compete at the World Championships in Montreal, but these were canceled as a result of the coronavirus pandemic.

2020–21 season 
Cain/LeDuc were assigned to begin the season at the 2020 Skate America in Las Vegas, which, due to the ISU's desire to minimize international travel during the pandemic, was attended only by skaters training in the United States.  They placed fourth in the short program after both underrotated their jumps and Cain two-footed the land of their throw Lutz. They were third in the free skate but remained in fourth place overall.

Competing next at the 2021 U.S. Championships, also held in Las Vegas, they placed fourth in the short program after Cain fell on her jump attempt and again two-footed the throw Lutz landing. Second in the free skate, they rose to the bronze medal position overall. They were named as first alternates to the 2021 World team and were later called up after the withdrawal of silver medalists Calalang/Johnson. They placed ninth at the World Championships.

2021–22 season 
The duo's preparations for the Olympic season were hampered by Cain contracting COVID-19 in late summer, as a result of which they withdrew from their planned debut at the Skating Club of Boston's Cranberry Cup. Instead, they first appeared on the Challenger series at the 2021 CS Autumn Classic International, where they won the bronze medal. At their second Challenger event, the 2021 CS Finlandia Trophy, they won a second bronze medal, defeating Calalang/Johnson narrowly.

On the Grand Prix at 2021 Skate Canada International, Cain/LeDuc were sixth in the short program, but a second-place free skate took them to the bronze medal. Cain-Gribble said, "there were a lot of levels we didn’t get which kept our score under the 130-mark, but we are going to focus on consistency" looking forward. They placed fourth at their second event, the 2021 NHK Trophy, finishing with a new personal best in the free skate.

With defending national champions Knierim/Frazier forced to withdraw from the 2022 U.S. Championships but still anticipated to be named to the U.S. Olympic team, the contest for the second American berth was widely seen to be between Cain/LeDuc and Calalang/Johnson. Cain/LeDuc placed first in both segments of the competition, with the only error being Cain doubling out on a planned triple Salchow jump, while Calalang/Johnson made several errors and finished in second. They were named to the U.S. Olympic team the following day. LeDuc called the prospect "something we've dreamed about for a long time. We have worked so extremely hard and have visualized this so many times." In a February 2022 interview, LeDuc said that rather than a "romantic" approach to pair skating, they and Cain"[have] always been about equality and showing two amazing athletes coming together to create something beautiful." Commenting on the partnership, their coach, Peter Cain, stated: "They don't ever point fingers or blame each other. One person can make a mistake, and it’s the team, not the individual."

At the 2022 Winter Olympics in the pairs event, Cain/LeDuc placed eighth. They skated a strong short program to finish seventh in the segment. Cain had injured her right ankle in practice days earlier but said that "in the last two years, what we've learned the most is how to adapt to what has come our way, and this was just another thing that we needed to adapt to." In the free skate, Cain's multiple jump errors dropped them to ninth in that segment and eighth overall.

Days after the Olympics concluded, Vladimir Putin ordered an invasion of Ukraine, as a result of which the International Skating Union banned all Russian and Belarusian skaters from competing at the 2022 World Championships. As well, the Chinese Skating Association opted not to send athletes to compete in Montpellier. As those countries’ athletes comprised the entirety of the top five pairs at the Olympics, this greatly impacted the field. Cain/LeDuc entered the event as medal favorites. They placed second in the short program with a mostly clean program. Cain struggled in the free skate, falling on her triple loop jump and a throw triple Lutz, before a third fall on a triple Salchow caused her to hit her head on the ice. The program was stopped, and Cain was taken off the ice by medics on a stretcher for evaluation.

On June 13, Cain and Leduc announced their retirement from competitive skating. Cain said she would engage in professional skating in shows and keep coaching in Euless with her parents.

Programs

With LeDuc

Ladies' singles

With Reagan

Competitive highlights 
GP: Grand Prix; CS: Challenger Series; JGP: Junior Grand Prix. Pewter medals (4th place) awarded only at U.S. national, sectional, and regional events.

Pairs with LeDuc

Ladies' singles

Pairs with Reagan

Pairs with Sidorov

Detailed results

Pairs with LeDuc 
ISU personal best scores highlighted in bold. Historical personal bests highlighted in bold and italicized.

References

External links 

 Official website of Cain/LeDuc at FigureSkatersOnline.com
 
 Official website of Ashley Cain
 Ashley Cain (@icegirlash) on Twitter

American female single skaters
American female pair skaters
1995 births
Living people
People from Carrollton, Texas
People from Coppell, Texas
Four Continents Figure Skating Championships medalists
21st-century American women
American sportspeople of Canadian descent
American people of Australian descent
Figure skaters at the 2022 Winter Olympics
Olympic figure skaters of the United States